Cephalanthera austiniae is a species of orchid known as the phantom orchid and snow orchid because the entire plant is white except for a few yellow markings on the flowers.

The orchid is native to the western United States (California, Oregon, Washington and Idaho), and to British Columbia, Canada. Cephalanthera austiniae is the only species of genus Cephalanthera native to the Western Hemisphere.

This is also the only Cephalanthera species entirely dependent on symbiotic mycorrhizae for its nutrition. This mycoheterotrophic orchid has no chlorophyll, so it makes no energy for itself.

Description 
Cephalanthera austiniae is a distinctive plant, rising from the dark, moist forest floor on waxy white stems and bearing orchid blossoms which are white or yellowish with yellow centers. Its leaves, if present, are rudimentary since such structures are not needed for collecting sunlight. Instead, this mycoheterotroph derives both its energy and nutrients from ectomycorrhizal fungi representing a variety of taxa within the Thelephoraceae

Conservation 
The plant is becoming more scarce as its habitat—dense, isolated forest—becomes more rare. Climate change models forecast decline and possible extinction of this species by the year 2100

References

External links 

 Info Sheet - Canadian Phantom Orchids
 Photo gallery

austiniae
Myco-heterotrophic orchids
Orchids of Canada
Orchids of the United States
Orchids of California
Flora of the West Coast of the United States
Flora of British Columbia
Flora of Idaho
Flora of Nevada
Flora of Oregon
Flora of Washington (state)
Flora of the Cascade Range
Flora of the Klamath Mountains
Flora of California
Flora of the Sierra Nevada (United States)
Natural history of the California Coast Ranges
Natural history of the Peninsular Ranges
Plants described in 1877
Flora without expected TNC conservation status